Shaun Micallef's Mad as Hell is an Australian comedy news television program hosted by Shaun Micallef. The show first aired on ABC at 8:00 pm on Friday, 25 May 2012. The show was named as Most Outstanding Comedy Program at the Logie Awards of 2016. Its title is a reference to the 1976 American satirical black comedy-drama film Network.

Cast
Micallef hosts the program, with at least five other cast members appearing, each as multiple characters, including Micallef.

Notes

Broadcast
The program was commissioned without a pilot and the first series of 10 episodes originally screened from May to July 2012. The show was renewed for a second series of 12 episodes which aired in 2013. A third was announced in January 2014 and consisted of 10 episodes, shown weekly from 12 February 2014. A fourth series premiered later in the same year on 24 September 2014 and the fifth series premiered on 11 February 2015. A sixth series debuted on 11 May 2016. The show's seventh series commenced on 21 June 2017. An eighth series debuted on 31 January 2018, with a ninth series running from September 2018. A tenth series was confirmed for July 2019 by Micallef on Twitter in December 2018 and it debuted on 26 June 2019.

At the ABC 2020 Upfronts, Micallef confirmed that two series would be produced in 2020, starting with Season 11, to air in early February. The second half of the eleventh season saw the show taping without an audience, due to social distancing requirements amid the COVID-19 pandemic. The twelfth season was scheduled to commence 5 August; and began by recording new episodes without an audience. A special Christmas episode was broadcast on 20 December 2020.

In July 2022, news broke that the show would not be returning with its current cast. Shaun clarified that discussions were ongoing with the ABC regarding evolving the show, but confirmed that the "original version" with Shaun in the main chair would not be returning forever.

Recurring segments and characters 

Bill Shorten's Zingers

A regular segment during the early period of Bill Shorten's tenure as Leader of the Opposition. Micallef would play a short video clip of Shorten delivering a pun, dad joke or similar, usually when he was criticising the government, after which "Zinger!" would appear in bold text on the screen with a roaring sound for humorous effect. The segment was noticed by Shorten himself, as he referenced it in a press conference when attacking the government on its funding cuts to the ABC, after which he said "I tell you what, I tell you Shaun Micallef, I'm as mad as hell and we’ll fight for your show." This was made a zinger in the subsequent week's episode of the show.

Lamentable Puns

Micallef and "junior sub-editor" of the Daily Telegraph, Chris Lorax (played by Tosh Greenslade), go through a series of front page and article headlines of the newspaper. Micallef shows the headline in question for Lorax to explain, much to Micallef's bemusement over both the headline and Lorax's justification for it. Lorax usually responds to Micallef's bemusement with "It’s just a bit of fun."

HYPERthetical

A segment where Micallef moderates a debate between several people about a hypothetical issue. Topics discussed in the segment include euthanasia and same-sex marriage. This segment is a parody of the ABC show Tomorrow Tonight (TV series) which was hosted by Charlie Pickering and Annabel Crabb. 

Darius Horsham

Spokesperson (sometimes stylised as "$pokesb0rg") for the Minister for Finance, Mathias Cormann. He speaks in a thick Germanic accent in a parody of Arnold Schwarzenegger and Cormann himself, and often seen aggressively chewing on a cigar – in reference to controversy caused when Cormann and Joe Hockey were filmed smoking cigars after delivering the 2014 Federal Budget. When asked by Micallef to elaborate on a point made, or is otherwise criticised, he usually responds with "Don't be an economic girly-man" or some variation. Cormann himself, presumably in reference to the character, referred to Bill Shorten as an "economic girly-man".

Dolly Norman

The simple speaking and thinking speechwriter to politician Jacqui Lambie. Often includes short film clips of Lambie saying something seemingly nonsensical or offensive, to which Norman responds by explaining what Lambie "really meant".

Lois Price

Played by Emily Taheny. A play on the "traffic chopper" on morning television programs reporting on traffic conditions, only Lois Price reports on current events. She usually signs off with an advertorial before saying "I'm Lois Price from Mad as Hell."

Tosh Greenslade

Played as himself. Micallef will usually introduce him as "Tosh Greenslade in a wig and glasses to talk about ..." (to which Greenslade's intro is usually "exactly right, Shaun") to explain the "reasons" behind government policy using novel concepts for humorous effect. In one episode, for example, Greenslade "explained"  the government's asylum seeker boat turn-back policy using the layers of a lamington. Micallef then signs him out with a variation of the line "that was Tosh Greenslade in a wig and glasses talking about ...".

Casper Jonquil

Played by Tosh Greenslade. A parody of a talkback radio shock jock and listener who complains loudly and unintelligibly. Jonquil has appeared since Series 2, and is seen to have had various occupations, including one sketch in which he claims to be a qualified osteopath, and another in which he is a member of the local neighbourhood watch, claiming that the boyfriend of his love interest, Spakfilla Vole, is in fact a terrorist. He also is shown to host his own talk show, Right Minded, and in one sketch, a quiz show, Why the Hell?, a parody of the real ABC quiz show Hard Quiz.

Vice Rear Admiral Sir Bobo Gargle

Played by Francis Greenslade. Sir Bobo Gargle is a Vice Rear Admiral in the Australian Navy. He appears on the show to discuss Australian and international maritime matters. Sir Bobo Gargle usually ends his interviews by releasing the Kraken (played by Michael Ward, one of the show's writers).

Larry Sideburns 

Played by Francis Greenslade. Often appears as a plot character in sketches as well as other segments of the show and is portrayed as an entrepreneur trying to monetise his next big thing. Often featured alongside his wife who is often spoken over.

Draymella Burt

Played by Emily Taheny. Draymella Burt is a spokesperson for the Liberal Party. She is best known for her brutal quips at Shaun about his left-wing bias.

Brion Pegmatite

Played by Tosh Greenslade. Brion Pegmatite is a spokesperson for Peter Dutton. He finds it painful to show remorse, pleasure or compassion, and is often seen wanting vengeance against Scott Morrison and other members of the Liberal Party, especially when leadership is brought into question.

Tamara Happenstance

Tourism Australia ambassador. Portrayed as a character wearing an Australian outback hat with corks dangling off the sides, as well as an apron with 'G’day' written on it with an image of the Australian flag. She often ends her sentences with common Australian tropes such as "put a shrimp on the barbie you bastards" that become increasingly vulgar as the segment progresses.

Episodes

Series 1 (2012)

Series 2 (2013)

Series 3 (2014)

Series 4 (2014)

Series 5 (2015)

Series 6 (2016)

Series 7 (2017)

This was the final season to be filmed at the ABC Ripponlea Studios, with episode 12 being one of the last TV shows filmed at the historic studios.

Series 8 (2018)

Series 9 (2018)

Series 10 (2019)

Notes
a. Originally scheduled to air on 17 July, episode 3 was broadcast in error. The episode was subsequently released on ABC iView, and broadcast on 18 July on ABC TV.

Series 11 (2020)

Series 12 (2020)

Special

Series 13 (2021)

Series 14 (2022)

Series 15 (2022)

Awards

|-
| 2013
| Peter Beck
| AACTA Award for Best Television Comedy Series
| 
|-
| 2013
| Shaun Micallef's Mad as Hell
| Logie Award for Most Outstanding Light Entertainment Program
| 
|-
| rowspan=2|2014
| Shaun Micallef
| AACTA Award for Best Performance in a Television Comedy
| 
|-
| Shaun Micallef and Peter Beck
| AACTA Award for Best Television Comedy or Light Entertainment Series
| 
|-
| 2016
| Shaun Micallef's Mad as Hell
| Logie Award for Most Outstanding Comedy Program
| 
|-
| 2017
| Shaun Micallef's Mad as Hell
| Logie Award for Most Outstanding Comedy Program
| 
|-
| 2018
| Shaun Micallef's Mad as Hell
| Logie Award for Most Popular Comedy Program
| 
|-
| 2019
| Shaun Micallef's Mad as Hell
| Logie Award for Most Popular Comedy Program
| 
|-
| 2020
| Shaun Micallef's Mad as Hell
| AACTA Award for Best Comedy Entertainment Program
| 
|}

See also
 Newstopia

References

External links
 
 

Australian Broadcasting Corporation original programming
2012 Australian television series debuts
2022 Australian television series endings
English-language television shows
Australian comedy television series
Television series by ITV Studios
Television shows set in Melbourne